The 1923 Wellington City mayoral election was part of the New Zealand local elections held that same year. In 1923, elections were held for the Mayor of Wellington plus other local government positions including fifteen city councillors. The polling was conducted using the standard first-past-the-post electoral method.

Background
Incumbent mayor Robert Wright was narrowly re-elected for a second term seeing off a strong challenge from local Labour MP Peter Fraser, the closest election result Wellington had ever seen. It would remain the narrowest Mayoral election in Wellington until 2010.

Mayoralty results

Councillor results

References

Mayoral elections in Wellington
1923 elections in New Zealand
Politics of the Wellington Region
1920s in Wellington